Rostanga muscula is a species of sea slug, a dorid nudibranch, a marine gastropod mollusc in the family Discodorididae.

Distribution
This species is endemic to New Zealand.

Description
This dorid nudibranch is bright orange to reddish-orange, and the dorsum is covered with caryophyllidia; it is very similar to other species of Rostanga.

Ecology
This is a common intertidal species. It feeds on the red sponge, Microciona coccinea (family Microcionidae). It is also found to eat the introduced sponge, Ophlitaspongia seriata (=Ophlitaspongia papilla) and the native Holoplocamium neozelanicum

References

 Spencer, H.G., Marshall, B.A. & Willan, R.C. (2009). Checklist of New Zealand living Mollusca. Pp 196-219. in: Gordon, D.P. (ed.) New Zealand inventory of biodiversity. Volume one. Kingdom Animalia: Radiata, Lophotrochozoa, Deuterostomia. Canterbury University Press, Christchurch.

External links
 Abraham P. (1877). Revision of the anthobranchiate nudibranchiate Mollusca with descriptions or notices of forty-one hitherto undescribed species. Proceedings of the Zoological Society of London. 1877: 196-269, pl. 28-30
 Cheeseman T.F. 1881. On some new species of Nudibranchiate Mollusca. Transactions and Proceedings of the Royal Society of New Zealand 13: 222-224
 Spencer H.G., Willan R.C., Marshall B.A. & Murray T.J. (2011). Checklist of the Recent Mollusca Recorded from the New Zealand Exclusive Economic Zone
 Eliot, C. N. E. (1907). Nudibranchs from New Zealand and the Falkland Islands. Proceedings of the Malacological Society of London. 7(6): 327-361

Discodorididae
Gastropods described in 1877
Taxa named by Phineas S. Abraham